Benjamin Edward Higgins (born March 23, 1989), is an American television personality and entrepreneur who starred on the 20th season of ABC's The Bachelor, after appearing on the 11th season of The Bachelorette.

Early life
Higgins was born and raised in Warsaw, Indiana. He attended Indiana University, where he received a degree in public affairs from its School of Public and Environmental Affairs. After graduating college in 2012, he worked as an account manager in Golden, Colorado.

Television show appearances

The Bachelorette

Higgins first appeared as a contestant in the ABC reality show The Bachelorette in 2015, as one of Kaitlyn Bristowe's suitors. He was eliminated by Bristowe after fantasy-suite dates and finished as the second runner-up.

The Bachelor

Higgins was announced as the Bachelor on the Bachelor in Paradise After Show. The season concluded on March 14, 2016 in which 25-year-old flight attendant Lauren Bushnell was named the winner for this season and ultimately becoming Higgins' fiancée until they ended their engagement on May 15, 2017. Their breakup was the most-Googled celebrity breakup of 2017.

Ben & Lauren: Happily Ever After? 
On October 11, 2016, Higgins and his fiancée Lauren Bushnell returned to television in the Freeform reality show Ben and Lauren, Happily Ever After?  The show followed the couple's adjustment to regular life together after being engaged on The Bachelor. It aired for a single season before their breakup was announced on May 15, 2017.

Bachelor Winter Games

In 2018, Higgins became a contestant on the ABC reality show The Bachelor Winter Games. He left the show early after not connecting with anyone romantically.

Personal life
Higgins began a relationship with Nashville resident Jessica Clarke in November 2018. They became engaged in March 2020 at Clarke's home in Nashville, after Higgins' initial proposal plans were impacted by the COVID-19 pandemic lockdown, and were married on November 13, 2021. They currently live in Denver, Colorado.

Career
In 2017, Higgins and business partners Riley Fuller and Drew Scholl founded Generous Coffee, a Denver-based roasted-coffee business. The company said it planned to use its profits to support nonprofit organizations and other enterprises globally. Higgins also co-owns Middle Eastern restaurant Ash'Kara.

Higgins co-hosts the Ben & Ashley I. Almost Famous Podcast on iHeartRadio with Ashley Iaconetti.

HIggins has written a memoir named "Alone in Plain Sight: Searching for Connection When You're Seen but Not Known" due for release on February 2, 2021, which is being published by Thomas Nelson. It is described as a "Biographies & Memoirs | Christian | Self-Help" and is described as this: "The co-founder of Generous Coffee and lead of The Bachelor's twentieth season reveals the key to being seen and known, as well as to lead a life that truly matters. In Alone in Plain Sight, Higgins shares his perspective as a fellow sojourner on the journey to find connection and meaning. Examining the questions he has wrestled with personally, he invites us to realize that the measure of how connected we are with ourselves is how connected we are with others; discover why connection with others is essential and how shared pain can bridge even the widest gaps between two very different people; deconstruct the fairy-tale view of love that culture advertises and address the lie that being single is a disease that needs to be cured; and understand that the God who seeks connection is the answer to the deep yearning we have to connect to something bigger than ourselves.

References

External links
 Official profile on ABC's The Bachelor site

Living people
Indiana University alumni
1989 births
People from Warsaw, Indiana
Participants in American reality television series